Samuel "Brian" Hill is an American politician and businessman serving as a member of the Oklahoma House of Representatives from the 47th district. Elected in November 2018, he assumed office on January 14, 2019.

Education 
Hill earned a Bachelor of Applied Science degree in human development and family studies from Southwestern Christian University.

Career 
Outside of politics, Hill has worked as a youth pastor and businessman. Hill has founded a Christian youth magazine, daycare center, and venture capital firm. He was elected to the Oklahoma House of Representatives in November 2018 and assumed office on January 14, 2019. Hill also serves as vice chair of the House Rules Committee.

References 

Living people
Southwestern Christian University alumni
Republican Party members of the Oklahoma House of Representatives
21st-century American politicians
Year of birth missing (living people)